Zairo Anuar bin Zalani (born 18 June 1982) is a Malaysian football player currently plays for Hanelang in the Malaysia FAM League. Zairo plays mainly as central midfielder but can also play as an attacking midfielder. He is known for having a powerful shot and has turned that into valuable goals for his teams.

Club career

Terengganu FA
He started his professional career at Terengganu in 2001, playing for the team for 9 seasons. After that, he moved to T-Team which also based in Terengganu, in 2010.

T-Team FC
He was a captain for his time while playing for T-Team. Zairo was top local goal scorer in 2012. He scored 13 goals in 2012 Malaysia Super League.

Kelantan FA
During 2013 Malaysia Super League season, Zairo has signed a contract with Malaysia top club, Kelantan. On 5 January, he made his debut with the team during Charity Cup. Unfortunately, Kelantan lose to ATM during that match. During 2013 AFC Cup 4th match against SHB Đà Nẵng the absence of Badhri Radzi and Shakir Shaari in the middle of the park slightly effects the team performance. Despite missing the key players, credit should be given to Zairo who did slot through a superb pass to Dickson Nwakaeme before the Nigerian slot home to give the 1–0 lead to the team in the 73rd minute.

Career statistics

Club

Honours

Club

Kelantan
 Malaysia Cup: Runner-up 2013
 Malaysia FA Cup: 2013
 Malaysia Charity Shield: Runner-up 2013

Style of play
Zairo is a free kick specialist. He also able to make the right pass to his teammate and create chances to score a goal.

International career
Zairo was part of the Malaysia U-23 team who participated in the 2005 SEA Games that win the bronze medal. He then made his international senior debut against New Zealand national team on 19 February 2006.

In 2008, he appeared for the Malaysia selection in an exhibition match against Chelsea, coming on as a second-half substitute for Hardi Jaafar.

References

External links
 Profile  at theredwarriorsfc.com
 Zairo Anuar Zalani at SoccerPunter.com
 
 
 Zairo Anuar Zalani at www.ganusoccer.net
 Zairo Anuar Zalani profile at F.A.M. official website 
 Zairo Anuar Zalani at Goal.com

1982 births
Living people
Malaysian footballers
Malaysia international footballers
Terengganu FC players
Terengganu F.C. II players
Kelantan FA players
People from Terengganu
Malaysia Super League players
Association football midfielders
Malaysian people of Malay descent